Seah Leong Peng was a politician from DAP. He was the Member of Perak State Legislative Assembly for Pasir Bedamar from 1999 to 2013. In the 2013 Malaysian general election, he was appointed to contest for the Teluk Intan parliamentary seat and he defeated the by-then President of Gerakan, Datuk Mah Siew Keong.

Election results

Death 
He died on 1 May 2014 due to bladder cancer in University Malaya Medical Centre. After his death, a by-election was held on 31 May 2014 to choose a new Member of Parliament.

See also 

 Teluk Intan (federal constituency)
 Pasir Bedamar (state constituency)
 2014 Telok Intan by-election

Reference 

1966 births
2014 deaths
Democratic Action Party (Malaysia) politicians
Malaysian politicians of Chinese descent